Consider This is the second EP by Australian pop punk band Tonight Alive. It was first recorded and released through Takedown Records in 2010, and was later re-released through both Sony Records and Fearless Records in 2011.

Track listing

References

External links

Consider This at YouTube (streamed copy where licensed)

2010 albums
Fearless Records albums
Tonight Alive albums